MUH Arla is a cooperative dairy firm with its head office in Pronsfeld in the county of Bitburg-Prüm in the German state of Rhineland-Palatinate. In 2011 it processed 1,317 million kilograms of milk, that had been supplied by 2,442 milk producers (as at 31 December 2011) from the regions of the Eifel, Moselle, the Rhineland, the Lower Rhine, the Bergisches Land, Belgium and Luxembourg. The cooperative has over 48 filling sites that produce over a billion cartons annually. In October 2012, It was reported that, Muh and Arla merged into Germany's third-largest dairy. In September 2017, Arla Foods would be expecting growth at the Eifel site Pronsfeld.

Range 
MUH's product range includes:

 UHT milk
 ESL milk
 Condensed milk
 Cream
 Sour cream
 Milkshakes
 Coffee cream
 dessert sauce
 Butter/Margarine

References

External links 

 

Dairy products companies of Germany
Cooperatives in Germany
Companies based in Rhineland-Palatinate
Bitburg-Prüm